The Legend of the White Snake is a Chinese legend centered around a romance between a man named Xu Xian and a snake spirit named Bai Suzhen. It has since been presented in a number of major Chinese operas, films, and television series.

The earliest attempt to fictionalize the story in printed form appears to be The White Maiden Locked for Eternity in the Leifeng Pagoda in Feng Menglong's Stories to Caution the World, which was written during the Ming dynasty.

The legend is now counted as one of China's Four Great Folktales, the others being Lady Meng Jiang, Butterfly Lovers, and The Cowherd and the Weaver Girl.

Basic story
Lü Dongbin, one of the Eight Immortals, disguises himself as a tangyuan vendor at the Broken Bridge near the West Lake in Hangzhou. A boy called Xu Xian buys some tangyuan from Lü Dongbin without knowing that they are actually immortality pills. After eating them, he does not feel hungry for the next three days so he goes back to ask the vendor why. Lü Dongbin laughs and carries Xu Xian to the bridge, where he flips him upside-down and causes him to vomit the tangyuan into the lake.

In the lake dwells a white snake spirit who has been practicing Taoist magical arts. She eats the pills and gains 500 years' worth of magical powers. She, therefore, feels grateful to Xu Xian, and their fates become intertwined. There is another terrapin (or tortoise) spirit also training in the lake who did not manage to consume any of the pills; he is very jealous of the white snake. One day, the white snake sees a beggar on the bridge who has caught a green snake and wants to dig out the snake's gall and sell it. The white snake transforms into a woman and buys the green snake from the beggar, thus saving the green snake's life. The green snake is grateful to the white snake and she regards the white snake as an elder sister.

Eighteen years later, during the Qingming Festival, the white and green snakes transform themselves into two young women called Bai Suzhen and Xiaoqing, respectively. They meet Xu Xian at the Broken Bridge in Hangzhou. Xu Xian lends them his umbrella because it is raining. Xu Xian and Bai Suzhen gradually fall in love and are eventually married. They move to Zhenjiang, where they open a medicine shop.

In the meantime, the terrapin spirit has accumulated enough powers to take on human form, so he transforms into a Buddhist monk called Fahai. Still angry with Bai Suzhen, Fahai plots to break up her relationship with Xu Xian. He approaches Xu Xian and tells him that during the Duanwu Festival his wife should drink realgar wine, an alcoholic drink commonly consumed during that festival. Bai Suzhen unsuspectingly drinks the wine and reveals her true form as a large white snake. Xu Xian dies of shock after seeing that his wife is not human. Bai Suzhen and Xiaoqing travel to Mount Emei, where they brave danger to steal a magical herb that restores Xu Xian to life.

After coming back to life, Xu Xian still maintains his love for Bai Suzhen despite knowing her true nature. Fahai tries to separate them again by capturing Xu Xian and imprisoning him at the Jinshan Temple. Bai Suzhen and Xiaoqing fight with Fahai to rescue Xu Xian. During the battle, Bai Suzhen uses her powers to flood the temple, causing collateral damage and drowning many innocent people in the process. However, her powers are limited because she is already pregnant with Xu Xian's child, so she fails to save her husband. Xu Xian later manages to escape from Jinshan Temple and reunite with his wife in Hangzhou, where Bai Suzhen gives birth to their son, Xu Mengjiao. Fahai tracks them down, defeats Bai Suzhen and imprisons her in Leifeng Pagoda. Xiaoqing flees, vowing vengeance.

Twenty years later, Xu Mengjiao earns the position of zhuangyuan (top scholar) in the imperial examination and returns home in glory to visit his parents. At the same time, Xiaoqing, who had spent the intervening years refining her powers, goes to the Jinshan Temple to confront Fahai and defeats him. Bai Suzhen is freed from Leifeng Pagoda and reunited with her husband and son, while Fahai flees and hides inside the stomach of a crab. There is a saying that a crab's internal fat is orange because it resembles the color of Fahai's kasaya.

Modifications and alternate versions
The white snake was simply known as the "White Lady" or "White Maiden" in the original tale in Feng Menglong's Stories to Caution the World. The name "Bai Suzhen" was created in a later era.

The original story was a story of good and evil, with the Buddhist monk Fahai setting out to save Xu Xian's soul from the white snake spirit, who was depicted as an evil demon. Over the centuries, however, the legend has evolved from a horror tale to a romance story, with Bai Suzhen and Xu Xian being genuinely in love with each other even though their relationship is forbidden by the laws of nature.

Some adaptations of the legend in theater, film, television and other media have made extensive modifications to the original story, including the following:

 The green snake (Xiaoqing) is portrayed as a treacherous antagonist who betrays the white snake, as opposed to the traditional depiction of her as the white snake's close friend and confidant.
 Alternatively, the green snake (Xiaoqing) is less evolved, less well-trained compared to the white snake (Bai Suzhen), and thus less cognisant of what it means to be human. She is more animalistic and therefore sometimes at odds with Bai Suzhen, thus explaining their differences both in character and actions.
 Fahai is portrayed in a more sympathetic light as opposed to the traditional depiction of him as a vindictive and jealous villain: rigid and authoritarian, yet well-intentioned. His background story is also different in some adaptations.
 Bai Suzhen is freed from Leifeng Pagoda because her son's filial piety moved Heaven.
 A retcon or revisionist version of the story relates that Xu Xian and Bai Suzhen were actually immortals who fell in love and were banished from Heaven because celestial laws forbade their romance. They are reincarnated as a male human and a female white snake spirit respectively and their story begins.

Adaptations

See also 
Chinese mythology
Duanwu Festival
Leifeng Pagoda
Melusine
Snakes in Chinese mythology

Notes

References and further reading

External links

 Fashion/art film starring Daphne Guinness, directed by Indrani.
Legend of White Snake – Stage Performance from Penang, Malaysia
 Stories to Caution the World in Google Books
 Lady White Snake
Oregon Shakespeare Festival, 2012 production
White snake in dream meaning and interpretation at snake dream meaning.

 
Legendary serpents
Shapeshifting
Chinese operas
Female legendary creatures
Hangzhou in fiction
Love stories
Buddhist folklore
Chinese legends